Kai Alaerts (born 6 September 1989) is a Belgian alpine skier. He competed in the 2018 Winter Olympics.

References

1989 births
Living people
Alpine skiers at the 2018 Winter Olympics
Belgian male alpine skiers
Olympic alpine skiers of Belgium